

Champions
World Series: New York Yankees over New York Giants (4–2)

Awards and honors
League Award
Babe Ruth, New York Yankees, OF

Statistical leaders

Major league baseball final standings

American League final standings

National League final standings

Negro leagues final standings

Negro National League final standings

†Memphis was not in the league but their games counted in the standings.

Eastern Colored League final standings

Events

January
January 3 – The New York Yankees selects two rookies from the Boston Red Sox; pitcher George Pipgras and outfielder Harvey Hendrick in exchange for backup catcher Al DeVormer. Then 27 days later, the Red Sox continue to feed the Yankees by sending them pitcher Herb Pennock for infielder Norm McMillan, outfielder Camp Skinner, pitcher George Murray, and $50,000 cash.

February
February 2 – Red Schoendienst is born in Germantown, Illinois. Primarily a second baseman, Schoendienst will hit .289 during a 19-year career with the St. Louis Cardinals, New York Giants and Milwaukee Braves. He will win election to the Hall of Fame in 1989.
February 20 – Christy Mathewson, along with Emil Fuchs, purchase the Boston Braves franchise for $300,000. Matthews is named as team president, though failing health reduces Matthewson's role to just a figurehead and he turns over the role of team president to Fuchs at the end of the season.

March
March 6 – The St. Louis Cardinals announce that their players will wear numerals on their uniforms and number them according to the batting order, but it does not happen this season.
March 8 – Pitcher Rube Benton is reinstated by Commissioner Landis even though Benton admitted to having prior knowledge regarding the 1919 world Series fix.

April
April 3 – Swede Risberg and Happy Felsch sue the Chicago White Sox seeking back salary and an addition $400,000 in damages. Though acquitted on charges they fixed the 1919 World Series, both players were banned for life. 
April 7 – The longest National League opener (to date) took place with the Brooklyn Dodgers and Philadelphia Phillies battling head-to-head for a grueling, fourteen innings and a 5–5 tie.
April 18 – The New York Yankees defeat the Boston Red Sox, 4–1, in the very first game at old Yankee Stadium. In the third inning, Babe Ruth hits the stadium's first-ever home run, a shot off Howard Ehmke with Whitey Witt and Joe Dugan on base.
April 20 – In a 5–3 loss to the St. Louis Browns, Detroit Tigers future Hall of Famer Heinie Manush makes his major league debut, and hits a double in his only at-bat.
April 23 – The New York Yankees sign first baseman Lou Gehrig

May
May 2 – Washington Senators pitcher	Walter Johnson gets his 100th career shutout and New York Yankees shortstop Everett Scott gets a gold medal from the American League for playing in his 1,000th consecutive game. Scott began his streak on June 20, 1916. Washington defeats the Yankees, 3–0, as Johnson allows just three hits.
May 11:
The Philadelphia Phillies and the St. Louis Cardinals bash a game-record 10 home runs, as the Phillies beat the Cardinals, 20–14. Cy Williams hit three homers with seven RBI for Philadelphia, while teammate Johnny Mokan adds two homers, a double, and seven RBI. Besides, Les Mann belts two homers for St. Louis‚ and losing pitcher Bill Sherdel connects one. Overall, 23 batters hit safely with the two teams combining for 79 total bases. Williams now has 12 home runs, which tops the Major Leagues.
In Pacific League action, Vernon Tigers outfielder Pete Schneider collects five home runs, including two grand slams and 14 runs batted in, in a 35–11 victory over the Salt Lake Bees. Vernon also adds a double that hits two feet from the top of the center field wall. A former Major League pitcher, Vernon won 20 games for the Cincinnati Reds in its 1917 season, while his five homers and 14 RBI, settled records in the Pacific League that still stands today.
May 12 – The St. Louis Browns sell the contract of pitcher Sloppy Thurston to the Chicago White Sox.
May 13 – Joe Sewell of the Cleveland Indians strikes out twice in one game for the first time in his career. Washington Senators rookie Cy Warmoth is the pitcher. In a 14-year career, Sewell will have only one other multiple strikeout game.
May 18 – Benny Bengough makes his major league debut for the New York Yankees in their 9–4 win over the St. Louis Browns. Bengough would serve as a back-up catcher on the Yankees 1927 Murders Row team.
May 19 – For the first time in major league history, brothers on opposite teams hit home runs in the same game. Boston Red Sox catcher Rick Ferrell homers off his brother Wes Ferrell in the second inning, but the Cleveland Indians pitcher returns the favor as he homers in the third on a pitch called by his sibling. It is the only time that the Ferrell brothers homer in the same game.
May 25 – Detroit Tigers legend Ty Cobb scored his 1,741 run to pass another legend, Pittsburgh Pirates' Honus Wagner. Cobb went on to hold ninety separate Major League records when he retired in 1928.

June
June 1 – Heinie Groh, Ross Youngs and Jimmie O'Connell collects five hits apiece, a first in the 20th century, as the New York Giants score in all nine innings, setting also a Major League record, while beating the Philadelphia Phillies 22–8 at Baker Bowl. It has been done only once since in the National League by the St. Louis Cardinals (September 13,‚1964), but never in the American League. O'Connell hit three doubles, one home run‚and a single in his five safeties, good for seven runs batted in. Pitcher Claude Jonnard is credited with the win.
June 3 – After pitching a complete game the day before, Detroit Tigers Herman Pillette relieves in the 8th inning against the Cleveland Indians with Detroit up, 7–5. Pillette allows both inherited runners to score, but the Tigers tally a run in the bottom of the 9th to give him his second win in two days.
June 7 – The Boston Braves trade Hank Gowdy and Mule Watson to the New York Giants in exchange for Earl Smith and Jesse Barnes. 
June 15 – After going two-for-four with a double, two runs batted in and a run scored, New York Yankees star first baseman Wally Pipp is rested by manager Miller Huggins, allowing recently signed rookie Lou Gehrig to make his major league debut in the Yankees' 10–0 victory over the St. Louis Browns. Gehrig does not receive an at bat.
June 23 through July 22 – The Cleveland Indians play 31 consecutive home games against the other American League teams, finishing their homestand with a 16–15 record.
June 26 – Moe Berg, who would go on to be a spy for the United States during World War II, is signed by the Brooklyn Robins as a free agent.

July
July 2 – Already down 7–0 to the St. Louis Browns, future Hall of Fame pitcher Ted Lyons makes his major league debut with the Chicago White Sox, and throws a perfect inning.
July 7 – In the first game of a double header at Dunn Field, the Cleveland Indians set an American League record after scoring in every inning against the Boston Red Sox. The feat was completed in eight innings (the home team did not bat in the ninth). The Indians collected 24 hits and 14 walks, while scoring 13 runs in the sixth inning for an embarrassing 27–3 victory. Cleveland win the second game as well, 8–5.
July 10 – In a doubleheader, St. Louis Cardinals rookie pitcher Johnny Stuart hurled two complete game victories over the Boston Braves, winning by scores of 11–1 and 6–3, while allowing three hits in the opener and 10 in the nightcap.
July 11 – Harry Frazee, owner of the Boston Red Sox since 1916, sells the club for over $1 million to a group of Ohio businessmen. Veteran front office man Bob Quinn will run the Red  Sox, and as team president he will work to restore the credibility of a franchise whose best players had been sold off by Frazee over the years.
July 22 – Walter Johnson of the Washington Senators founds the 3,000 strikeout club.
July 24 – New York Yankees pitcher Carl Mays beats the Philadelphia Athletics at Shibe Park, 9–2, setting an American League record with his 24th straight win. This also matches the Major League high of Christy Mathewson, who won 24 consecutive games in the National League.

August
August 3 – All Major League Baseball games are postponed after the sudden death of U.S. President Warren G. Harding the night before.
August 4 – Travis Jackson drives in eight runs on four hits to lead the New York Giants to a 14–4 victory over the Cincinnati Reds.
August 13 – Pittsburgh Pirates outfielder Max Carey steals second base, third base and home plate against the Brooklyn Robins. Carey will again lead the National League with 51 stolen bases and, equally fleet in the field, will garner 450 putouts and 28 assists in the season. Besides, Carey becomes the first outfielder in the majors to catch 400 or more putouts six times. Richie Ashburn will later do it nine times.
August 15 – Washington Senators left-hander George Mogridge becomes the only pitcher in Major League history to steal home in extra innings, when he scores an insurance run in the 12th in a 5–1 win over the Chicago White Sox at Comiskey Park.
August 17 – The New York Yankees edge the St. Louis Browns at Sportsman's Park, 5–4. Babe Ruth hits his 31st home run in the 1st inning and adds a double in the 8th. After 111 games, Ruth is batting .401. He will wind up with his highest average at .393, leading the American League with 205 hits, 41 homers, 151 runs, a Major League record 170 walks, and will reach base a record 379 times en route to the AL MVP Award.

September
September 4 – Sad Sam Jones pitches a no-hitter for the New York Yankees in a 2–0 win over the Philadelphia Athletics.
September 7 – Boston Red Sox pitcher Howard Ehmke tosses a no-hitter in a 4–0 win over the Philadelphia Athletics, marking the second time in four days Philadelphia is no-hit.
September 14 – Boston Red Sox first baseman George Burns completed the third unassisted triple play in Major League Baseball history during the second inning of a game against the Cleveland Indians, as he gathered in a Frank Brower line drive, tags Rube Lutzke coming from first base, and beat Riggs Stephenson while returning to second. Boston wins, 2–0.
September 16 – A riot broke out at Wrigley Field  after umpire Charley Moran made an out call at second base on Chicago Cubs' Sparky Adams. Commissioner Judge Kenesaw Mountain Landis was in attendance and shook his cane at the angry mob, as Moran and the other officials were pelted by hundreds of empty bottles. After holding up play for over fifteen minutes, the game resumed with the visiting New York Giants winning, 10–6.
September 17 – George Kelly of the New York Giants sets a major-league record by hitting home runs in three consecutive innings (3rd, 4th and 5th) against Chicago Cubs pitcher Vic Aldridge, as New York rolls to a 13–6 win. Kelly adds a single and double to run his total bases to 15 for the game. Kelly has now hit a record six homers off cousin Aldridge this year, a mark off one pitcher that will be tied by Ted Williams in the 1941 season, off Johnny Rigney, and Ted Kluszewski in 1954, off Max Surkont.
September 24 – Future Hall of Famer Bill Terry makes his major league debut with the New York Giants in a 6–3 loss to the Cincinnati Reds.
September 28 – The New York Yankees defeat the Boston Red Sox by a difference of twenty runs at Fenway Park, 24–4.
September 29 – Future Hall of Famer Hack Wilson makes his major league debut for the New York Giants in a 5–1 loss to the Brooklyn Dodgers.

October
October 6 – In the fourth inning of the second game of a doubleheader, Boston Braves shortstop Ernie Padgett turns the fourth unassisted triple play in Major League history in a 4–1 Braves win over the Philadelphia Phillies.
October 10 – Game One of the 1923 World Series is won by the New York Giants on a ninth inning inside-the-park home run by Casey Stengel.
October 11 – The New York Yankees win their first World Series game against the New York Giants in nine tries on two home runs by Babe Ruth. Going back to the 1921 World Series, they were 0-8-1, with a tie game in the 1922 World Series.
October 12 – A solo home run by Casey Stengel in the seventh inning is the only run of the third game of the World Series.
October 13 – The Yankees get off to an 8–0 lead in game four of the World Series, and win it, 8–3.
October 14 – Joe Dugan hits the second inside-the-park home run of the World Series, as the Yankees defeat the Giants, 8–1.
October 15 – The New York Yankees defeat the New York Giants, 4–2, in Game 6 of the World Series to win their first World Championship, four games to two. The Yankees opened their new Yankee Stadium in April making it the third time that a team had inaugurated a new stadium with a World Series win. The three consecutive matchups between the Yankees and Giants (1921–1923) marked the only time, to date, that three straight World Series featured the same two clubs.

November
November 12 – New York Giants owner and manager John McGraw trades outfielders Casey Stengel and Bill Cunningham along with shortstop Dave Bancroft to the Boston Braves in exchange for pitchers Joe Oeschger and Bill Southworth.

December
December 11 – Pitcher Carl Mays is purchased by the Cincinnati Reds from the New York Yankees.
December 13 – Boston Braves acquire second baseman Cotton Tierney from the Philadelphia Phillies in exchange for shortstop Hod Ford and outfielder Ray Powell, who is later replaced by outfielder Al Nixon.
December 16 – The Eastern Colored League is formed with Ed Bolden serving as chairman.

Births

January
January 3 – John André
January 5 – Johnny Ritchey
January 6 – Red Hardy
January 8 – Ray Flanigan
January 11 – Frank Fanovich
January 14 – Ken Johnson
January 16 – Dick Sipek
January 20 – Elizabeth Emry
January 23 – Cot Deal
January 30 – Walt Dropo

February
February 2 – Red Schoendienst
February 3 – Edith Barney
February 5 – Chuck Diering
February 16 – Ribs Raney
February 17 – Dorothy Ferguson
February 17 – Bill Sommers
February 19 – Russ Sullivan
February 20 – Walter McCoy
February 22 – Anne Surkowski
February 26 – Jean Ladd

March
March 3 – Barney Martin
March 7 – Bobo Holloman
March 17 – Pat Seerey
March 21 – Jim Hughes
March 21 – Merle Keagle
March 22 – George Crowe
March 23 – Barney Koch
March 24 – Zander Hollander

April
April 7 – Lois Barker
April 9 – Josephine Figlo
April 11 – Scott Cary
April 14 – Alonzo Perry
April 17 – Solly Hemus
April 20 – Philomena Gianfrancisco
April 20 – Preston Gómez
April 23 – Daniel Donahue
April 23 – Alice Haylett
April 23 – Sammy Meeks
April 27 – Kite Thomas
April 28 – Dolores Klosowski

May
May 1 – Kay Blumetta
May 5 – Jim Kirby
May 6 – Earl Turner
May 11 – Louise Arnold
May 12 – Ed Lyons
May 15 – Dale Matthewson
May 18 – Don Lund
May 20 – José Zardón
May 21 – Alta Little
May 23 – Jerry McCarthy
May 28 – Bob Kuzava

June
June 3 – Elma Steck
June 8 – Hal Kleine
June 11 – Jerre DeNoble
June 16 – Allie Clark
June 23 – Pablo García
June 24 – Mel Hoderlein
June 25 – Barney White
June 27 – Gus Zernial

July
July 7 – Ed Sanicki
July 7 – Joe Smaza
July 15 – Bruce Edwards
July 15 – Marion Fricano
July 16 – Len Okrie
July 18 – Lorraine Borg
July 21 – Paul Burris
July 23 – Luis Aloma
July 26 – Leo Thomas
July 27 – Ray Boone
July 30 – Paul Minner

August
August 1 – George Bamberger
August 9 – George Vico
August 10 – Gary Gearhart
August 10 – Pete Gebrian
August 10 – Bob Porterfield
August 17 – Tom Clyde
August 17 – Duke Markell
August 21 – Hilly Flitcraft
August 27 – Don Grate

September
September 17 – Les Peden
September 17 – Bob Rothel
September 18 – Joe Tepsic
September 22 – Tom Wright
September 23 – Dorothy Collins
September 24 – Geraldine Guest
September 26 – Elsie Wingrove

October
October 3 – Joanne Overleese
October 10 – Saul Rogovin
October 11 – Martha Haines
October 25 – Russ Meyer
October 25 – Bobby Thomson
October 26 – Tommy Glaviano
October 28 – Thelma Grambo
October 29 – John Mackinson

November
November 9 – Ted Sepkowski
November 10 – Cal Ermer
November 11 – Lee Howard
November 17 – Mike Garcia
November 18 – Roy Wise
November 24 – Danny Ozark
November 25 – Archie Wilson
November 27 – Bob Schultz

December
December 4 – Dick Strahs
December 5 – Eleanor Dapkus
December 8 – Stan Landes
December 13 – Larry Doby
December 14 – Paul LaPalme
December 15 – Bill Bonness
December 19 – Vern Freiburger
December 20 – Grant Dunlap
December 22 – Bob Hall
December 28 – Tony Daniels
December 28 – Don Thompson
December 30 – Harry Elliott

Deaths

January–February
January 1 – Willie Keeler, 50, Hall of Fame right fielder and prolific bunter who compiled a .341 lifetime batting average, two National League batting champion titles, batted over .370 from 1894–99, including a .424 mark and record 44-game hitting streak for 1897 Orioles, while leading the league in singles seven times, hits three times and runs once, ranking second all-time in hits and runs upon retirement.
January 22 – Fred Cooke, 49, outfielder for the 1897 Cleveland Spiders of the National League.
January 25 – Nick Wise, 56, catcher/outfielder for the 1888 Boston Beaneaters of the National League.
January 28 – John Meister, 59, infield/outfield utility for the New York Metropolitans of the American Association during the 1886–1887 seasons.
February 4 – George Tebeau, 61, outfielder nicknamed ″White Wings″ for his blazing speed, who hit .269 and stole 228 bases in 627 games for four teams, and  later became the owner of the Kansas City Blues American Association franchise.
February 17 – George Meakim, 57, pitcher who played between 1890 and 1895 with the Louisville Colonels, Chicago Colts, Philadelphia Athletics and Cincinnati Reds.
February 28 – Jim Britt, 67, pitcher who played from 1872 to 1873 for the Brooklyn Atlantics of the National Association.

March–April
March 3 – Harry Clarke, 62, right fielder for the 1889 Washington Nationals of the National League.
March 3 – Ducky Hemp, 60, outfielder for the Louisville Colonels, Pittsburgh Alleghenys and Stars between 1887 and 1890.
March 15 – Pete Wood, 56, Canadian-born pitcher for the Buffalo Bisons in 1885 and the Philadelphia Quakers in 1889.
March 15 – Goat Anderson, 43, outfielder for the 1907 Pittsburgh Pirates.
March 17 – Mortimer Hogan, 61, outfielder for the Milwaukee Brewers, New York Metropolitans and Cleveland Blues between 1884 and 1888.
April 10 – Jay Faatz, 62, first baseman for three teams, who also played and managed for the 1890 Buffalo Bisons of the Players' League in the 1890 season.
April 10 – Jim Gill, 57, second baseman/centerfielder for the 1889 St. Louis Browns of the American Association.
April 13 – Gene Krapp, 35, pitcher who played with the Cleveland Naps of the American League (1911–1912) and the Buffalo Buffeds/Blues of the Federal League (1914–1915).
April 20 – Jack Lynch, 66, pitcher who posted a 110–105 record and a 3.69 ERA in 221 games for three teams, and a member of the New York Metropolitans team who won the American Association pennant in 1884.
April 21 – Joe Ellick, 69, right fielder for four different teams and a player/manager for the Chicago Browns/Pittsburgh Stogies of the Union Association in 1884; later, umpired in the National League (1886) and American Association (1888–1889).
April 27 – Paul Sentell, 43, infielder who played from 1906 to 1907 for the Philadelphia Phillies.

May–June
May 23 – Willard Mains, 54, pitcher who posted a 16–17 record and a 3.53 ERA in parts of four seasons for the Chicago White Stockings, Cincinnati Kelly's Killers, Milwaukee Brewers and Boston Beaneaters.
June 3 – Harry Billiard, 39, pitcher who played with the New York Highlanders (1908), Indianapolis Hoosiers (1914) and Newark Pepper (1915).
June 10 – Bill Annis, 66, outfielder for the 1884 Boston Beaneaters of the National League.
June 11 – George Hall, 74, British-born outfielder who played from 1866 through 1877 for nine different teams, while hitting a .322 average in 365 career games and leading the National League in home runs in 1876.
June 12 – Cliff Carroll, 63, outfielder who hit a .251 average in 991 games for six different teams between 1882 and 1893.
June 19 – Tom Jones, 46, first baseman who hit .251 with 964 hits and 135 stolen bases for three American League teams between 1902 and 1910.
June 21 – Claude Elliott, 46, pitcher who played from 1904 to 1905 for the Cincinnati Reds and New York Giants.
June 21 – Bill Grevell, 25, pitcher for the 1919 Philadelphia Athletics of the American League.

July–August
July 10 – Joe Stabell, [?], outfielder for the 1885 Buffalo Bisons of the National League.
July 19 – Nate Kellogg, 64, shortstop who played briefly for the 1885 Detroit Wolverines of the National League.
August 15 – Marty Hogan, 53, British-born outfielder who played from 1894 through 1895 for the Cincinnati Reds and St. Louis Browns of the National League.
August 16 – Bill Day, 56, pitcher for the Philadelphia Quakers/Phillies and the Pittsburgh Alleghenys of the National League from 1889 to 1890.
August 16 – Jim Scoggins, 32, pitcher for the 1913 Chicago White Sox of the American League.
August 22 – Jay Budd, 57, left fielder who played one game in 1890 for the Cleveland Infants of the short-lived Players' League.
August 29 – Jocko Milligan, 62, catcher/first baseman who played from 1884 to 1893 for six National League teams, most prominently with the Philadelphia Athletics.

September–October
September 1 – Frank McManus, 48, catcher who played between 1899 and 1904 with the Washington Senators and Brooklyn Superbas of the National League and the Detroit Tigers and New York Highlanders of the American League.
September 3 – Jack Barnett, 43, backup outfielder for the St. Louis Cardinals in the 1907 season.
September 5 – Dots Miller, 36, infielder who spent twelve seasons with the Pittsburgh Pirates, St. Louis Cardinals and Philadelphia Phillies, and a member of the Pittsburgh team that won the National League pennant and defeated the Detroit Tigers in the 1909 World Series.
September 9 – George Keerl, 76, second baseman for the 1875 Chicago White Stockings of the National League.
September 18 – General Stafford, 55, versatile fielder who played over 100 games at three different positions for five teams, and a member of the 1898 National League Champion Boston Beaneaters.
October 21 – Biff Sheehan, 55,  outfielder/first baseman for the St. Louis Browns of the National League during the 1895 and 1896 seasons.
October 22 – Warren McLaughlin, 47, pitcher who played for the Philadelphia Phillies and Pittsburgh Pirates between 1900 and 1903.
October 29 – Jack Nabors, 35, pitcher for the Philadelphia Athletics of the American League from 1915 to 1917, who lost 19 consecutive decisions in 1916 to set a major league record that has never been matched.
October 29 – Jimmy Ryan, 60, center fielder for five teams between 1895 and 1903; a .306 career hitter who led the National League in hits, home runs, doubles and slugging in 1888; recovered from a serious injury in 1893 train wreck to hit .361 the next year, and finished third all-time in hits, fourth in runs and home runs upon retirement.

November–December
November 5 – Buck Becannon, 64, pitcher who played from 1884 to 1885 for the New York Metropolitans of the American Association and with the 1887 New York Giants of the National League.
November 12 – Mark Polhemus, 63, outfielder who played in 1887 with the Indianapolis Hoosiers of the Union Association.
November 16 – Fred House, 33, pitcher who posted a 1–2 record and a 5.20 ERA for the Detroit Tigers in 1913.
November 19 – Frank Pears, 57, pitcher for the 1889 Kansas City Cowboys of the American Association and the 1893 St. Louis Browns of the National League.
December 9 – Wild Bill Donovan, 47, pitcher who had 25-win seasons with 1901 Brooklyn and 1907 Detroit teams; later managed Highlanders and Phillies

References